Ikumo Dam is a gravity dam located in Yamaguchi prefecture in Japan. The dam is used for power production. The catchment area of the dam is 212.1 km2. The dam impounds about 7  ha of land when full and can store 346 thousand cubic meters of water. The construction of the dam was completed in 1953.

References

Dams in Yamaguchi Prefecture
1953 establishments in Japan